Diadochia is a genus of moths of the family Noctuidae.

Species
 Diadochia saca Püngeler, 1914

References
Natural History Museum Lepidoptera genus database
Diadochia at funet

Hadeninae